The Orillia Terriers were a Canadian senior ice hockey team from Orillia, Ontario, Canada that competed in the OHA Senior A from 1966 to 1979, and represented in the Central Ontario Junior B Hockey League from 1979 to 1981 (Intermediate A) by the Orillia Travelways, and for the 1981-82 season by the Orillia Terriers in the Ontario Junior A Hockey League.

The Terriers are not known to be connected with the Couchiching Terriers of the Ontario Provincial Junior A Hockey League, although the junior club was known as the Orillia Terriers from 1989 to 1997.

History
The team originated as the Orillia Pepsis in 1966, but changed their name to the Terriers in 1969.

The Terriers won the J. Ross Robertson Cup as the OHA Senior A League champions in 1970 and 1973. The Terriers also won the 1973 Allan Cup as Canadian Senior A champions, defeating the visiting St. Boniface Mohawks of Manitoba 4-1 in a best-of-seven final playdown series. They had lost the 1970 national final to the Spokane Jets.

The 1972-73 edition of the club featured a number of veterans like Mike Draper, Gary Milroy and Grant Moore, all of whom had been in place since the first season, 1968-69. Also on the team were: Claire Alexander, who later played for the Toronto Maple Leafs; Jim Keon, brother of then-Leaf captain Dave Keon; Blake Ball, who played Gilmore Tuttle in the 1977 film "Slap Shot"; and goalie Louis Levasseur, who went on to all-star status in the World Hockey Association.

Orillia dropped down to Intermediate A in 1979 and left that league in 1982.

Season-by-season results

Notable alumni
Claire Alexander
Jean-Louis Levasseur

References

Defunct ice hockey teams in Canada
Ice hockey teams in Ontario
Senior ice hockey teams
Sport in Orillia
1966 establishments in Ontario
Ice hockey clubs established in 1966
1982 disestablishments in Ontario
Ice hockey clubs disestablished in 1982